The 1979–80 Notre Dame Fighting Irish men's basketball team represented the University of Notre Dame during the 1979–80 NCAA Division I men's basketball season. The team was coached by Digger Phelps and was ranked in the Associated Press poll for the entirety of the season.

Preseason
The Irish were ranked fifth in the preseason AP Poll, behind Indiana, Kentucky, Duke and Ohio State. While they lost frontcourt contributors Bruce Flowers and Bill Laimbeer to graduation, they added a recruiting class ranked fourth nationally by the 1979–80 Street & Smith basketball yearbook. The class included McDonald's All-Americans Tim Andree and John Paxson and highly regarded forward Bill Varner. Key returning players were 1979 All-American Kelly Tripucka and future National Basketball Association (NBA) players Tracy Jackson, Bill Hanzlik and Orlando Woolridge. Woolridge was moved from forward to center to replace Flowers and Laimbeer. Senior point guard Rich Branning was selected co-captain of the team with Hanzlik.

Leading up to an Olympic year, Notre Dame played an exhibition game against the Soviet National Team, notching a surprising 86–76 win behind Tripucka's 35 points.

Regular season
The Irish suffered an early setback as senior co-captain Hanzlik missed several games with a dislocated finger, but fared well, compiling a 6–0 record in his absence, including a marquee win against UCLA. The Irish won the contest behind clutch free throws and defense from freshman John Paxson. After the team's fast start, The Irish found themselves ranked third in the country and facing second-ranked Kentucky at Freedom Hall in Louisville. Despite the Wildcats missing starters Sam Bowie and Dirk Minniefield, the Irish lost the game 80–86. A January loss to San Francisco left the Irish on a two-game losing streak. The highlight of the Irish's season came on February 27, 1980, when they upset top-ranked DePaul 76–74 in double-overtime. The Irish were led by Kelly Tripucka's 28 points and the win was sealed by two free throws by Orlando Woolridge. The Irish were able to overcome a big scoring push by future NBA All-Stars Mark Aguirre (28 points) and Terry Cummings (16). A regular-season finale 62–54 win at Dayton raised the Irish's record to 22–5.

Roster

NCAA tournament
Notre Dame was selected for the 1980 NCAA tournament and were the 4 seed in the Midwest Region, slated to play the winner of a first-round game between Missouri and San Jose State in Lincoln, Nebraska. Fifth-seeded Missouri upset the Irish 87–84 in overtime behind senior Mark Dressler's 32 points, wasting a 29-point effort by Tracy Jackson.

Schedule

|-
!colspan=12 style=| NCAA tournament

Players selected in NBA drafts

References 

Notre Dame
Notre Dame
Notre Dame Fighting Irish
Notre Dame Fighting Irish
Notre Dame Fighting Irish men's basketball seasons